Rod Shafer is an American football coach.  He served as head football coach at Webber International University in Babson Park, Florida from 2002 to 2005 and Warner University in Lake Wales, Florida from 2014 to 2018.

Head coaching record

College

References

Year of birth missing (living people)
Living people
High school football coaches in Florida
Warner Royals football coaches
Webber International Warriors football coaches
Taylor University alumni